Stearns Lending, LLC is one of the American wholesale, retail and correspondent lender. Stearns is one of the largest mortgage lenders in the US , Stearns was the fifth-largest privately held lender nationwide.

Overview 
Glenn Stearns founded the company in 1989. He was chief executive officer (CEO) from its founding until May 2012 when Stearns named Brian Hale, former president and national production executive of MetLife Home Loans, as his successor.  On May 15, 2017, David Schneider joined Stearns Lending as CEO and a member of its board of managers.

Stearns was featured on the Inc. 5000 list of fastest growing private companies in America in 2013, 2014 and 2015. In August 2015, Stearns' parent company, Stearns Holdings, LLC, was purchased by The Blackstone Group. The American Bankers Association added Stearns Lending to its list of endorsed lending services through the Corporation for American Banking in May 2016.

As of January 2021, Chicago-based lender Guaranteed Rate is acquiring Stearns for an undisclosed sum.

2019 Bankruptcy filing
On July 9, 2019, after Stearns' business did poorly in the rising interest rate environment of 2017–2018, Stearns Lending filed for Chapter 11 bankruptcy. The filing was precipitated by failure to come to an agreement on restructuring with Pacific Investment Management Company (PIMCO), which owns 67% of the $183 million in senior secured notes owed by Stearns. On September 11, 2019, Stearns announced that it had reached an agreement with its largest noteholders under which the noteholders will support a plan of reorganization.2021, Stearns folded into Guaranteed Rate.

References

1989 establishments in California
American companies established in 1989
Mortgage lenders of the United States
Companies based in Santa Ana, California
Financial services companies based in California
Financial services companies established in 1989
Companies that filed for Chapter 11 bankruptcy in 2019
The Blackstone Group companies
2015 mergers and acquisitions